Kwanza Constituency is an electoral constituency in Kenya. The constituency has seven wards, all of which elect member of county assembly for the Trans-Nzoia County Assembly. It is one of five constituencies in Trans-Nzoia County. The constituency was established for the 1988 elections. After the promulgation of the new constitution in 2010, the larger constituency was split into two constituencies, and Endebess Constituency was created out of it.

Members of Parliament

Wards

References 

Constituencies in Rift Valley Province
Constituencies in Trans-Nzoia County
1988 establishments in Kenya
Constituencies established in 1988